Adabari is a locality in Guwahati with nearest airport at Guwahati Airport and railway station and junction at Paltan Bazaar and Kamakhya. Surrounded by localities of Jalukbari and Maligaon, it is a busy commercial area of city. The area has been well developed and serves its residents with all the basic needs in locality. It has a few best four wheeler showrooms of Maruti, Hyundai etc. In Guwahati. Grocery departmental stores like Goodbuy and The Grocer Supermarket. Adding to the place is a structure in the memory of Lt. Bhupen Hazarika at the Jalukbari intersectio.

The place directly connects to the highway NH37. Adabari is major hub of transportation with regular vehicles plying to other districts of Lower Assam.

Adabari Tiniali is a busy three point-junction in the locality. The roads meeting there are the Pandu Port Road (Pranabananda Sarani), Assam Trunk Road and the lane leading to Kamakhya Nagar.

See also
 Bhetapara
 Beltola
 Chandmari
 Paltan Bazaar
 Ganeshguri

References

Neighbourhoods in Guwahati